Raymond “Ray” Hamilton was a U.S. soccer defender who earned two caps with the U.S. national team.

Both U.S. games came in defeats to Mexico in September 1937.  His first game was a 7-3 loss on September 19 and the second was a 5-1 loss on September 25.

References

United States men's international soccer players
Possibly living people
Year of birth missing
Association football defenders
American soccer players